Argopecten ventricosus is a species of bivalve belonging to the family Pectinidae.

The species is found in America.

References

ventricosus
Bivalves of North America
Bivalves described in 1842